Max Geuter (16 September 1937 – 27 August 2018) was a German fencer. He represented the United Team of Germany in 1964 and West Germany in 1968 and 1972 in the team épée events.

References

1937 births
2018 deaths
German male fencers
Olympic fencers of the United Team of Germany
Olympic fencers of West Germany
Fencers at the 1964 Summer Olympics
Fencers at the 1968 Summer Olympics
Fencers at the 1972 Summer Olympics
Sportspeople from Aachen